Line out can refer to:

 Line out (signal), an analog electrical signal for connection between audio devices
 Line-out (rugby union), a means of restarting play in rugby union
 Lineout (baseball), a type of play in baseball when a player catches a line drive